Cres (Greek: Χέρσος, Chersos) is an Adriatic island in Croatia. It is one of the northern islands in the Kvarner Gulf and can be reached via ferry from Rijeka,  the island Krk or from the Istrian peninsula (line Brestova-Porozina).

With an area of 405.78 km2, Cres is the same size as the neighbouring island of Krk, although Krk has for many years been thought the largest of the islands. Cres has a population of 3,079 (2011).

Cres and the neighbouring island of Lošinj once used to be one island, but were divided by a channel and connected with a bridge at the town of Osor. Cres's only freshwater source is Lake Vrana.

History

Cres has been inhabited since the Paleolithic time period. Its name predates classical antiquity and is derived from Proto-Indo-European *(s)quer- ("cliff"). Although this is one view, another more historically correct is from classical antiquity, when the town was founded and inhabited by ancient Greeks, and called it Chersos (Χέρσος); "chersos" in Greek means "barren land", "uncultivated land" and "dry heaths". Later, "Chersos" was resounded to "Cresta", from which eventually the modern name "Cherso-Cres" is derived.

Cres was later ruled by the Greeks and, by the 1st century B.C., the Roman Empire make province of Liburnia. After the fall of the Roman Empire the island was taken over and became a part of the Byzantine Empire, and remained this way for centuries, as one of the Dalmatian city-states. Slavs first arrived on the island in the early 9th century (believed to be somewhere around 812).

Around 866 the Byzantine inhabitants saw their first conflicts with the Republic of Venice. The Venetians eventually took control of Cres and the neighboring islands in the 10th and 11th centuries.

However, in the islands is being ruled for 400 years the Venetians took control. After Napoleon's victory over the Venetians, the island came under Austrian rule. After the defeat of Austria by Napoleon in 1809 the islands became part of the French Empire.

After the fall of Napoleon, Austria once again took control of the island for 100 years. During this time the economy developed with olive trees, sage, and other plants becoming key to the success of the island. At the end of World War I, with the Treaty of Rapallo signed in 1920, the island was once again handed over to Italy. This lasted until 1947 when the Islands, along with Istrian Peninsula, were assigned to Yugoslavia.

The island has gone through an agricultural downturn as many residents left the island in search of a better life on the mainland and abroad.  This has resulted in many former agricultural areas becoming overgrown with local vegetation. Recently people, primarily retirees, have been returning to live on the island. Tourism has become an increasingly important industry and the population experiences significant seasonal variation.

Towns of Cres

The island has several villages, all of them connected by a road that runs down the middle of the island. On one side is the ferry from Porozina to Brestova (in Istria). Another ferry runs from Merag to Valbiska (on the neighbouring island of Krk) ; on the other is the bridge to Lošinj (Lussino), which was once connected by land but is now separated by a waterway. 

A list of the villages with descriptions is below:
 Belej
 Beli – This small village, at the end of a long and very narrow road, is home to a famed bird species, the endangered Griffon vulture.
 Cres
 Lubenice – An ancient mountain village with a great view of the sea and neighboring islands. A restaurant and bar operate during the warmer months. Weekly musical concerts take place during the peak tourist season.
 Martinšćica – The home of a large vacation complex, Slatina, along with beaches and cafes. It also has an essential oils distillery. The town also has a small castle, known as "", which was once inhabited by a "Sforza" family of Italian nobility (apparently unrelated to the famous Milanese house) and by Napoleonic Imperial forces, before becoming a restaurant which recently closed.
 Merag -with ferry connections.
 Miholašćica- A small village with a church which shares the same name as the community. Tourism has grown here since the arrival of the Zaglav community nearby.
 Orlec – Another small village at the end of a narrow road, also home to the endangered vulture.
 Osor (it.: Ossero) - A town on the "border" between two islands. Founded by the Romans who also dug the channel thus dividing what was then known as the Osor island into Cres and Lošinj. Then a major port and commercial centre started to fade with coming of larger ships that could not pass the narrow channel or dock in the shallow port.
 Pernat – The westernmost village on Cape Pernat. A quaint and rustic village forming a  gateway to numerous walking trails and secluded beaches.
 Podol – Between Lubenice and Valun. A tiny hamlet that resembles a large farmhouse. Its key feature is the mulberry tree located in the middle of the road.
 Porozina – A small village comprising the ferry terminal and a few shops.
 Punta Križa (it.: Punta Croce) – The southernmost part of Cres. FKK resort is here.

 Stivan – On a side street this small hamlet of 16 people features a very private beach, old houses and a church, and is on the way to other villages.
 Valun – Visible on the way to Lubenice (see below), this village does not permit cars. A fee is charged for parking.
 Vidovići – A short distance uphill from Martinšćica. A village with an extraordinary view of the Istrian Peninsula and numerous islands including Zeča, Lošinj and Unije forming part of the archipelago. A restaurant "Mali Raj" once operated in the evenings during the warmer months.

Lake Vrana

Cres has its own fresh water lake, which is very highly guarded and illegal to swim or fish in.  It supplies water to neighboring Lošinj (it. Lussino) as well.  It is the largest lake in Croatia by volume and one of the deepest fresh water lakes in Eastern Europe, going down 76 meters at its deepest point (>50 m below sea-level).

Flora and fauna
Cres is home to many different types of nonvenomous snakes, including Elaphe quatuorlineata, Zamenis longissimus, Zamenis situla, and Natrix tessellata, a snake rare or absent on other Adriatic islands. The island has a relatively large breeding population of the endangered Eurasian griffon vulture, which can often be seen soaring over the island.

Climate 

The main part of Cres features a mid-latitude humid subtropical climate (Köppen : Cfa) under the Köppen climate classification. Winters are cool and damp, punctuated by the Bora wind and summers are hot and quite dry, bordering on a hot-summer mediterranean climate (Csa). Further south, Lošinj island enjoys a true hot-summer mediterranean climate (Csa) with cool and damp winters and hot, distinctly dry summers.

See also 

 List of islands in the Adriatic
 Lake Vrana
 Lubenice beach

References

 "Cres and Losinj: Strolling through the islands and islets" Nadir Mavrovic, Nerezine 1997. Televrina d.o.o. Nerezine

Sources

Bibliography
 Luigi Tomaz, Ossero e Cherso nei secoli prima di Venezia, Foreword by P. Antonio Bonmarco patriarch of Aquileia, Conselve 2002.
 Luigi Tomaz, La Magnifica Comunità di Cherso, Foreword by Arnaldo Mauri, Conselve 2010.
 Arnaldo Mauri, The economic and social life in the community of Cherso (Cres) through the centuries: a foreword, SSRN

External links

Tourist Board of Cres

 
Islands of Croatia
Islands of the Adriatic Sea
Seaside resorts in Croatia
Italian-speaking territorial units in Croatia